Otto Müller (June 1, 1816 – August 6, 1894) was a German novelist.

Biography
Müller was born at Schotten, Hesse-Darmstadt.  He began his career as a librarian at the court library at Darmstadt and edited newspapers at Frankfurt and Mannheim. In 1854 he established the Frankfurter Museum. In 1856, he settled in Stuttgart, where he died nearly forty years later, aged 78.

Works
His Ausgewählte Schriften (Selected Writings) appeared in Stuttgart in 1874 (12 vols.).

Fiction
He early published a series of novels. In 1845, appeared Bürger, ein deutsches Dichterleben, a novel. After that, he published Georg Völker. Ein Roman aus dem Jahre 1848 (a novel from the year 1848) and other political novels. Subsequent novels are:
 Charlotte Ackermann (1854)
 Der Stadtschultheiss von Frankfurt (1856; 3d ed. 1878), treating of Goethe's grandparents
 Der Klosterhof (1859)
 Aus Petrarca's alten Tagen (1862)
 Erzählungen und Charakterbilder (1865)
 Der Wildpfarrer (1866)
 Der Professor von Heidelberg (1870)
 Der Fall von Konstanz (1872)
 Der Majoratsherr (1873)
 Schatten auf Höhen (1881)

Notes

References
 
 

1816 births
1894 deaths
Writers from Stuttgart
German male journalists
German librarians
19th-century German journalists
German male novelists
19th-century German novelists
19th-century German male writers
19th-century German writers